Blitz is German industrial rock group KMFDM's sixteenth studio album, released on March 24, 2009, on KMFDM Records and Metropolis Records. It also marks the first use of five letter song titles and a five letter album title since WWIII.  The album charted after its release, as did the song "People of the Lie".  Blitz had songs written in three different languages, and was moderately well received by critics.  Most of its songs were remixed for the band's next release, Krieg.

Background
The symbol used for the first track, is a variation of the astronomical symbol for the planet Uranus, . Sascha Konietzko, the band's founder, mentions the lyrics "Up Uranus" in his blog, and at the place of the symbol in lyrics, "up Uranus" is sung.  "Bait and Switch" contains lyrics from "Hark! The Herald Angels Sing". The lyrics for "Davai" are Russian, while the lyrics for "Potz Blitz!" are German. The track "Me & My Gun" is a song loosely about the Columbine shooters, Eric Harris and Dylan Klebold.

Release
Blitz was released on March 24, 2009.  It was on Billboard'''s Dance/Electronic Albums Chart for four weeks, and peaked at No. 9.  It reached No. 1 on the CMJ Loud Rock Select chart and No. 15 on the FMQB Metal Detector chart. "People of the Lie" reached No. 1 for three weeks on CMJ's Loud Rock Select Tracks chart.

ReceptionBlitz'' received mixed to positive reviews.

Track listing

Personnel
All information from 2009 liner notes.

Musicians
 Lucia Cifarelli – vocals (1, 2, 4–6, 8, 10)
 Jules Hodgson – guitar (1–4, 6–10), drum programming (4), drum enhancement (9, 10), all instruments (5), production (1–10), mixing
 Sascha Konietzko – vocals (1–7, 9–11), analog synthesizers (1–4, 6–10), drum programming (1–4, 6–10), sitar (4), loops (7), P-Funk bass (8), all instruments (11), production, mixing
 Tim Skold – bass (1, 9), cymbals and hi-hats (1–4, 6, 9, 10), drum enhancement (1, 4, 8), drum sound design (2, 3, 6, 9, 10), Soviet synth (6, 8, 9), production (1–4, 6, 8–10)

Additional personnel
 Anna Koudriachova – countup (3)
 Andy Selway – digital synthesizers (8), drum programming (8)
 Steve White – guitar (8)
 Cheryl Wilson – vocals (8)

Production
 Brian Gardner – mastering
 Brute! – cover art
 Justin Gammon – layout
 Kirk Edward Mitchell – photography
 Vibrent Management – post production coordination

References

External links
Blitz at the official KMFDM website

2009 albums
KMFDM albums
Metropolis Records albums